Aeolochroma subrubescens is a moth of the family Geometridae first described by William Warren in 1896. It is found in Queensland, Australia.

References

Moths described in 1896
Pseudoterpnini
Moths of Australia